Discohelix is a genus of extinct sea snails, marine gastropod mollusks in the family Discohelicidae.

Species
The following species were brought into synonymy:
 Discohelix hedleyi Mestayer, 1916 accepted as Zerotula hedleyi (Mestayer, 1916)

The following species are alternate representation:
 Discohelix retifera Dall, 1892 represented as Pseudotorinia retifera (Dall, 1892) (alternate representation), in turn accepted as Pseudotorinia (an unresolved species complex).

References

External links
 Bieler R. (1993). "Architectonicidae of the Indo-Pacific (Mollusca, Gastropoda)". Abhandlungen des Naturwissenschaftlichen Vereins in Hamburg (NF) 30: 1–376.

Discohelicidae